Devil Sold His Soul are an ambient influenced post-hardcore band from London, formed in 2004 and signed to Nuclear Blast. Three members of the band used to be in Mahumodo. They released their debut studio album A Fragile Hope on 18 June, 2007, after the release of their debut EP Darkness Prevails, produced by Mark Williams. The band released their second studio album Blessed & Cursed (mixed by Steve Evetts) on 18 June, 2010. On 8 August, 2010, they played at the Hevy Music Festival held near Folkestone, Kent, before embarking on a UK tour with Architects. In January, 2011, the band announced that bassist Iain Trotter has left the band to pursue a career outside music. He was replaced by Jozef Norocky, former guitarist of Rinoa. In mid-March, 2013, Ed Gibbs announced that he would be leaving the band to also pursue a career outside the band after the upcoming music festivals were over. In April, Paul Green, one of the two vocalists of The Arusha Accord, replaced him as the band's vocalist. Devil Sold His Soul signed a deal with Basick at the end of 2013, coinciding with the release of a music video for their single "Time".

On 23 January, 2017, the band announced they will be playing their debut album A Fragile Hope in full on their upcoming tour and also the return of ‘Master’ Ed Gibbs on vocals alongside current vocalist Paul Green. After touring the UK and Japan in late 2017 and Spring 2018, the band began work on their upcoming 4th studio album titled Loss. Loss, which was released on 9 April, 2021, via Nuclear Blast Records, is the first studio album to feature the dual vocalists Ed Gibbs and Paul Green.

Members

Current
 Richard Chapple – guitar (2004–present)
 Jonny Renshaw – guitar (2004–present)
 Ed Gibbs – vocals (2004–2013, 2017–present)
 Alex "Leks" Wood – drums (2007–present)
 Jozef Norocky – bass guitar (2011–present)
 Paul Green – vocals (2013–present)

Past
 Tom Harriman – drums (2004–2006)
 Dave Robinson – drums (2006–2007)
 Iain Trotter – bass guitar (2004–2011)
 Paul Kitney – samples (2004–2020)

Timeline

Discography

Studio albums
 A Fragile Hope (18 June 2007)
 Blessed & Cursed (12 July 2010)
 Empire of Light (17 September 2012)
 Loss (9 April 2021)

EPs
 Darkness Prevails (2005)
Belong ╪ Betray (2014)

Splits
 Devil Sold His Soul/Tortuga (2008)

References

External links
 
 Official website

Post-metal musical groups
English metalcore musical groups
Musical groups from London
2004 establishments in England
Musical groups established in 2004
Century Media Records artists